John Jinks may refer to:

 John Jinks (politician) (died 1939), Irish politician
 John L. Jinks (1929–1987), British geneticist